Established in 2007, Canada's Olympic Broadcast Media Consortium (legal name 7048467 Canada Inc., also sometimes referred to informally in branding as CTV Olympics and RDS Olympiques, additionally referred to as the National Olympic Network by BBM Canada) was a joint venture set up by Canadian media companies Bell Media (formerly CTVglobemedia) and Rogers Media to produce the Canadian broadcasts of the 2010 Winter Olympics in Vancouver, British Columbia, Canada, and the 2012 Summer Olympics in London, England, as well as the two corresponding Paralympic Games. Bell owned 80% of the joint venture, and Rogers owned 20%.

The consortium encompassed many of the properties owned by both companies, including Bell Media's CTV Television Network, TSN, RDS and RDS Info, and Rogers Media's Omni Television, Sportsnet, OLN, and the Rogers radio stations group. Several other broadcasters carried consortium coverage, including Noovo (formerly V), and several channels owned by Asian Television Network. Finally, dedicated websites in English and French (ctvolympics.ca and rdsolympiques.ca) were set up to stream live coverage over the Internet to Canadian viewers. The consortium replaced CBC Sports, which had held the Canadian rights to all Olympics beginning with the 1996 games, although some cable rights had been sub-licensed to TSN / RDS beginning in 1998.

Rogers announced in September 2011 that it would withdraw from the consortium following London 2012, and therefore not participate in its bid for rights to the 2014 Winter Olympics and 2016 Summer Olympics. The company cited scheduling conflicts and financial considerations for the decision. Bell Media then announced a new partnership with the CBC to bid for Canadian broadcasting rights of Sochi 2014 and Rio 2016. Broadcast details for the joint bid were never released. The joint Bell/CBC bid was considered the prohibitive favourite to win the rights when the International Olympic Committee accepted bids. However, the Bell/CBC bids were rejected by the IOC.

On August 1, 2012, CBC Sports announced that it had made a deal to broadcast the 2014 and 2016 Summer and Winter Olympics, replacing the Bell/Rogers group. However, in February 2013, CBC announced that both Sportsnet and TSN would sub-license broadcast rights to the 2014 Winter Olympics.

Participating media outlets

Television
Primary coverage (live coverage of major events, and highlights of all events) was carried on CTV (English) and Noovo (French), known as V in 2010.
As there is no full-time CTV affiliate in Newfoundland and Labrador, coverage was simulcast on Bell-owned CTV Two Atlantic, which is available on cable in Newfoundland (in other areas, CTV Two carried normal programming). During the 2010 Winter Olympics, over-the-air station NTV carried only the opening and closing ceremonies, and coverage of the men's hockey gold medal game.
Noovo's coverage was produced by RDS and mostly used that channel's talent, as V has no in-house production staff for news or sports. Similarly, most hosts for CTV's coverage came from TSN.
Since Noovo has limited coverage outside Quebec, its coverage of the 2010 games was simulcast on the Cable Public Affairs Channel (CPAC), which has mandatory carriage on all cable and satellite providers.
Secondary coverage (full events and some highlights between events) aired primarily on TSN and Sportsnet (English), as well as RDS and RDS Info (French). Select TSN coverage was rebroadcast later on TSN2. OLN (English) also provided full-event coverage of selected outdoor events.
Multilingual coverage on various Omni Television stations:
Omni.1 (Ontario) only: Italian, Polish, Portuguese, Ukrainian
Omni.2 (Ontario), Omni Edmonton, Omni Calgary, Omni British Columbia: Cantonese, Mandarin
Omni BC only: Punjabi
Multilingual coverage on seven Asian Television Network channels:
ATN Bangla (Bengali)
ATN Gujarati (Gujarati)
ATN Channel (Hindi)
ATN Alpha ETC Punjabi and ATN MH1 (Punjabi)
ATN Jaya TV (Tamil)
ATN ARY Digital (Urdu)
APTN provided coverage of the 2010 games in several native languages; including (Cree, Dene, Inuktitut, Mechif, Mi'kmaq, Mohawk, Ojibway and Oji-Cree). In some cases the network was split, with commentary in two or three different languages on the East, West, and North feeds. It also aired some English and French coverage as an overflow channel. APTN did not participate in coverage for the 2012 Summer Olympics.

Radio
English-language radio coverage aired over Rogers's Sportsnet Radio Network. Ten Rogers stations, namely "Sportsnet Radio" (CJCL Toronto and CFAC Calgary), all-news or news/talk stations (CKWX Vancouver, CFTR Toronto, CFFR Calgary, CKGL Kitchener, CHNI-FM Saint John, CJNI-FM Halifax, and CKNI-FM Moncton), as well as CISQ-FM Whistler, were listed as "official" Consortium stations and typically air most if not all coverage. Portions of the coverage aired on other Rogers Media radio stations, as well as several other stations in non-competing markets (such as CTV-owned CKGM Montreal).
French-language radio coverage of the 2010 games was aired on Cogeco radio stations, primarily airing on CKAC Montreal (then an all-sports station). No similar coverage plans were announced for the 2012 games.

Other affiliated outlets
Several other Bell Media-owned channels, such as CTV News Channel and Discovery Channel) provided ancillary (non-event) coverage related to the games. CTV-owned music channel MuchMusic broadcast programming live from the Vancouver area throughout the 2010 games, including special editions of MuchOnDemand broadcast from Whistler.
The Globe and Mail, a national newspaper which was owned by CTVglobemedia at the time of the Vancouver games (and is currently 15% owned by Bell Media's parent company), was listed as part of the consortium and supplied content for its websites, however its sponsorship/coverage of the games is independent of the broadcast rights.

History

Early coverage
CTV has previously broadcast the Summer Games in 1976 (along with CBC) and 1992, and the Winter Games in 1964, 1968, 1972, 1976, 1980, 1984 (along with CBC), 1988 and 1994.

The 1980 "Miracle on Ice" game was aired live on CTV in Canada, but not ABC in the United States. Thus, American viewers who resided in or near the Canada–US border and received the CTV signal could watch the game live, but the rest of the United States had to wait for a delayed rebroadcast.

Rights fees
In 1974, Johnny Esaw (who anchored CTV's prime time Olympic coverage from 1964–1980) became vice-president of CTV Sports, a position he would hold until his retirement in 1990. He negotiated the host broadcasting rights to the 1988 Winter Olympics in Calgary, Alberta. As the main host broadcaster for the 1988 Winter Olympics, the CTV television network paid $45 million for domestic rights to the 1988 Winter Olympics. Esaw also brought the 1964 Winter Olympics to CTV.

Production of the broadcasting for the 1994 Winter Olympics in Lillehammer, Norway, which costs NOK 462 million, was the responsibility of the Norwegian Broadcasting Corporation (NRK), with assistance from CTV and the European Broadcasting Union (EBU). NRK had 1,424 people working at the Olympics, while international broadcasters sent an additional 4,050 accredited broadcasting personnel. The transmission rights for the games were held by EBU in Europe, CBS in the United States, NHK in Japan, CTV in Canada, the Asia-Pacific Broadcasting Union, Nine Network in Australia, as well as other broadcasters in other countries. The total transmission rights price was 350 million United States dollars.

Commentators
Rod Black anchored CTV's coverage of the 1992 Summer Olympics in Barcelona, Spain and 1994 Winter Olympics in Lillehammer, Norway.
Don Chevrier provided television network coverage of the Olympic Games for North American audiences since 1972, working for the CBC, the American Broadcasting Company (ABC), and the CTV Television Network before moving on to NBC. More recently, he covered events at the 2004 Summer Olympics, including badminton, table tennis, and synchronized swimming for NBC, and, along with longtime partner, Don Duguid, called curling at the 2002 Winter Olympics in Salt Lake City and in the 2006 Winter Olympics in Turin for NBC.
Rob Faulds worked on CTV's coverage of the 1992 Summer Olympics in Barcelona, Spain and the 1994 Winter Olympics in Lillehammer, Norway.
Dan Kelly was the lead play-by-play hockey broadcaster for CTV at the 1988 Winter Olympics in Calgary.
Dan Matheson hosted the network's coverage of the 1988 Winter Olympics in Calgary, the 1992 Summer Olympics in Barcelona, and the 1994 Winter Olympics in Lillehammer.
Jiggs McDonald did play-by-play on CTV for Olympic basketball games in 1992.
Greg Millen paired with Don Chevrier as the lead broadcasting team for CTV's ice hockey coverage at the 1994 Winter Olympics. The secondary team was Dan Shulman and Tom Watt.
Bernie Pascall broadcast Gymnastics at 1976 Montreal Olympics, Hockey 1976 from Innsbruck, Austria, Hockey 1980 Lake Placid, NY including only live TV in North America of USA vs Russia, also broadcast Hockey at 1984 Games in Sarajevo, Cross Country Skiing 1988 Calgary/Canmore
Valerie Pringle was a host of special events programming such as the network's 1993 election and 1995 Quebec referendum coverage and the 1994 Winter Olympics in Lillehammer, Norway.
Ron Reusch covered the 1980 Winter Olympics in Lake Placid, New York (ice hockey), the 1988 Winter Olympics in Calgary, Alberta (ice hockey), the 1992 Summer Olympics in Barcelona, Spain (baseball), and the 1994 Winter Olympics in Lillehammer, Norway (speed skating).
Frank Rigney was the colour commentator for both the CBC and CTV football broadcasts, plus covered other sports such as the 1980 Winter Olympics in Lake Placid, New York and the 1984 Winter Olympics in Sarajevo, Yugoslavia.
Lloyd Robertson was the prime time anchor for CTV's coverage in 1984 and 1988.

2010 Winter Olympics

For the 2010 Winter Olympics, coverage was as follows:

Television

Consortium coverage originated primarily from the Vancouver Convention Centre (the International Broadcast Centre for the 2010 games) as well as Mountain Square in Whistler.

CTV: An average of 22 hours per day of coverage, focusing on the major events and highlights. Times varied on certain days depending on events in progress
Olympic Morning: 3:00-9:00am PT (6:00-12:00pm ET), with Beverly Thomson, Jay Onrait, Seamus O'Regan, and Melissa Grelo
Olympic Daytime: 9:00am–2:30pm PT (12:00-5:30pm ET), with James Duthie, Lisa LaFlamme, and Michael Landsberg
Olympic Prime Time: 3:00-11:00pm PT (6:00-2:00am ET), with Brian Williams and Jennifer Hedger
Olympic Late Night: Midnight to 3:00am PT (3:00-6:00am ET), no host (event repeats)

The only breaks in coverage were for 30-minute local newscasts daily at 2:30 pm PT (5:30 pm ET), as well as a one-hour newscast produced by CTV British Columbia at 11:00pm PT (2:00 am ET). Two CTV National News summaries, anchored by Lloyd Robertson at CTV's main Vancouver studios, were aired nightly during Olympic Prime Time; the regular CTV National News broadcast aired solely on CTV News Channel for the duration of the games.  From 3:00 – 6:00am PT (6:00 – 9:00am ET) CTV News Channel also aired a simulcast of CTV's Olympic Morning.

Noovo (V): Major events and highlights in French, averaging 16.5 hours per day, including a morning show simulcast from RDS
TSN and Rogers Sportsnet: Full-event coverage, averaging 18 hours per day on each channel
OLN: Full-event coverage of outdoor events, averaging 4.5 hours per day
RDS: Full-event coverage in French, averaging 21 hours per day
RIS: Full-event coverage in French, averaging 6 hours per day
Omni: Multilingual coverage, averaging up to 6 hours per day (depending on location; not all coverage carried on all stations)
ATN: Multilingual coverage, averaging 6.5 hours a day across seven channels
APTN: Coverage in English, French, and Aboriginal languages, averaging 13 hours a day

The television broadcast was filmed with 39 new Hitachi SK-HD1000 studio/field cameras from Hitachi Kokusai Electric including on-site technical support. The cameras were also used to broadcast the 2012 Summer Olympics. Following the games, portions of CTV's set were re-purposed by its Vancouver affiliate CIVT for its newscasts.

Radio
English-language coverage was provided by the Sportsnet Radio Network, and included coverage of the opening and closing ceremonies, selected hockey games, special editions of Prime Time Sports, and various updates / programs on the games. French-language coverage, which was similar in scope, was carried by Corus Québec.

Broadcast team

Hockey studio
James Duthie (host)
Dave Hodge (host)
Daren Millard (host)
Bob McKenzie (analyst)
Nick Kypreos (analyst)
Darren Pang (analyst)

2012 Summer Olympics

The consortium also held rights to the 2012 Summer Olympics. Coverage plans for those games were follows (see above).

Broadcast team
English broadcasters

French broadcasters

Other rights

Paralympic Games
The consortium also owned rights to the corresponding Paralympic Games, namely the 2010 Winter Paralympics and the 2012 Summer Paralympics.

Coverage for the 2010 games consisted primarily of coverage of the opening ceremonies (live on CTV British Columbia, and on tape delay on the rest of the CTV network and RIS); daily highlights packages split among CTV, TSN and Sportsnet in English (and RDS / RIS in French); and live coverage of all sledge hockey games featuring the Canadian team. Although not originally scheduled, CTV and RDS later added live coverage of the closing ceremonies.

Coverage for the 2012 games offered no live television coverage and consisted primarily of 10 late night highlight shows carried on TSN2, Sportsnet One, and RDS2, though rebroadcasts of the opening ceremony were carried on both CTV and Rogers-owned broadcast network Citytv.

Criticism of Paralympic Games coverage

2010 Winter Paralympics opening and closing ceremonies
Originally, CTV did not plan to air the opening ceremony live. After receiving criticism on the decision, CTV changed its mind and decided to air the ceremony live in Vancouver region. CTV originally continued to stick to its initial plan of not airing the closing ceremony live. This decision led to more complaints and CTV relented by airing the closing ceremony live across Canada.

2012 Summer Paralympics
Despite the 2012 Summer Paralympics being a breakthrough games for international media coverage, giving a significant boost to the overall audience shares of British broadcaster Channel 4 and Australia's ABC, no Paralympics sports events were shown live on television in Canada or the United States. 
"Based on the level of overall coverage, it's clear that Canadian broadcasters do not deem disability to be important. They are not supporters of inclusion", SCI BC (BC Paraplegic Association) Executive Director Chris McBride said, contrasting Canada's coverage with Britain's. More than 1,000 people signed a petition calling for Canadian broadcasters to provide full Paralympics coverage at future Games. International Paralympic Committee President Philip Craven criticised North American broadcasters for having fallen behind and said in future the International Paralympic Committee would scrutinize broadcast partners more carefully. "If the values fit, we've got a chance. If they don't we'll go somewhere else", he said.

Youth Olympics
Finally, the consortium owned broadcast rights to the first Youth Olympic Games, the 2010 Summer Youth Olympics in Singapore. Coverage of those games was limited to a one-hour daily highlights package on Sportsnet and TSN2 (rebroadcast several weeks later on TSN).

See also
Olympics on CBC
List of 2010 Winter Olympics broadcasters
List of 2012 Summer Olympics broadcasters
Japan Consortium
Television Pool of Thailand

References

External links
CTV Olympics
RDS Olympiques 

2007 establishments in Canada
2010 in Canadian television
Olympics on Canadian television
CTV Sports
Joint ventures
The Sports Network
Sportsnet
Simulcasts